Kevin Jackman (born 30 June 1945) is a former Australian rules footballer who played with Footscray in the Victorian Football League (VFL).

Recruited locally from Seddon, Jackman was a left-footed rover. He won the Gardiner Medal in 1965, for his performances in the VFL reserves competition. The following year he was one of only two Footscray players to appear in all 18 home and away games and his 28 goals was enough to win his club's 1966 leading goal-kicker award.

Jackman was a member of Williamstown's 1969 premiership team.

References

External links
 
 

1945 births
Australian rules footballers from Victoria (Australia)
Western Bulldogs players
Williamstown Football Club players
Living people